Oswald Gebbie (1878–1956) was an Argentine rugby union footballer. He was President of The Argentine Rugby Union, between 1936 and 1940.

Career 

Gebbie was born in Florencio Varela, Buenos Aires, son of a family of British origin. He started his rugby playing career in Buenos Aires Cricket & Rugby Club. On June 12, 1910, Gebbie was part of the first national rugby team of Argentina. He debuted against British Lions team. The match was played in the stadium the Flores Athletic Club, with a score 28–3 in favor of the British.  

Oswald Gebbie playing as centre, he was the first captain in the Argentina national rugby union team.

References

External links 
en.espn.co.uk
www.argbrit.org

1878 births
1956 deaths
People from Florencio Varela Partido
Rugby union players from Buenos Aires
Argentine people of Scottish descent
Argentina international rugby union players
Argentine rugby union players
Argentine people of British descent
Río de la Plata